Martin L. Yarmush (born October 8, 1952 in Brooklyn, New York) is an American scientist, physician, and engineer known for his work in biotechnology and bioengineering. After spending 4 years as a Principal Research Associate in Chemical Engineering at MIT, in 1988 he joined Rutgers University, where he currently holds the Paul and Mary Monroe Endowed Chair in Science and Engineering and serves as Distinguished Professor of Biomedical Engineering. Yarmush is the founding director of the Center for Engineering in Medicine & Surgery (CEMS) at Massachusetts General Hospital. 
He is also a Lecturer in Surgery and Bioengineering at Harvard Medical School, and a member of the Senior Scientific Staff at the Shriners Hospital for Children, Boston.

Yarmush is the founding editor of the Annual Review of Biomedical Engineering which was first published in 1999 by the nonprofit publisher Annual Reviews.
He is a series editor for the book series Frontiers In Nanobiomedical Research. In 2017, Yarmush was elected as a member of the National Academy of Engineering "for pioneering advances in cellular, tissue, and organ engineering and for leadership in applying metabolic engineering to human health."

Education
Yarmush attended Yeshiva University, The Rockefeller University, Yale University School of Medicine, and the Massachusetts Institute of Technology (MIT).

Career
Yarmush has worked as a professor at MIT, Harvard, and Rutgers and has held adjunct positions at the University of Pennsylvania. He is known for his scholarly contributions in biotechnology and bioengineering; and for the many students and fellows that he has trained who have gone on to significant academic and industrial careers.

Yarmush is the founding director of the Center for Engineering in Medicine & Surgery (CEMS) at Massachusetts General Hospital. The center was established in 1995 by Massachusetts General Hospital, in coordination with MIT, Harvard, and Boston's Shriners Hospitals for Children, with support from the Whitaker Foundation.
At the time, Yarmush was a professor in the Harvard-MIT Division of Health Sciences and Technology (HST) and the Helen Andrus Benedict Professor of Surgery and Bioengineering at Harvard Medical School.

He currently holds the Paul and Mary Endowed Chair in Science and Engineering at Rutgers University. He also serves as a Bioengineer at the Massachusetts General Hospital and a Senior Scientific Staff Member at the Shriners Hospital for Children, Boston.

Research
Yarmush has published over 550 peer-reviewed articles with an H index of 104 (Google Scholar). Yarmush has filed patents for more than 60 inventions in medical and technical fields.
He has worked on wound healing, metabolic engineering, dynamic microfabricated cell and tissue systems, tissue engineering and regenerative medicine, including the development of non-invasive treatments to prevent scarring after burns.
Yarmush has helped to develop storage protocols that can increase the amount of time that a donor organ can be kept and still be viable for use in human transplant operations. 

Yarmush has led development of a robot for drawing blood samples which can be analyzed with a point-of-care downstream processing and analysis system. This device could decrease the most frequent type of clinical injuries for both patients and hospital staff, and provide immediate results to doctors. The venipuncture robot has been recently tested in a human clinical trial.

Awards

   2020, The Sackler Scholar, Sackler Institute of Advanced Studies, Tel Aviv University, Israel
   2018, Lady Davis Visiting Faculty Fellow and Institute Lecturer, Hebrew University, Jerusalem Israel
   2017, Fellow, US National Academy of Engineering
   2015, Robert A. Pritzker Distinguished Lecture Award from the Board of Directors of the Biomedical Engineering Society (BMES) 
   2015, Fellow, US National Academy of Inventors
  2013, Top 20 Translational Researchers, Nature Biotechnology
  2011, Food, Pharmaceutical and Bioengineering Division Award, American Institute of Chemical Engineers (AIChE) 
  2009, Keynote Speaker, ASME Summer Bioengineering Conference

References

Living people
1952 births
American Jews
People from Brooklyn
Scientists from New York City
Engineers from New York City
Annual Reviews (publisher) editors